Eros Danilo Araújo (born November 6, 1956 in Rio Bom, Paraná) is a Brazilian politician, former mayor of Telêmaco Borba, municipality in the state of Paraná in the Southern Region of Brazil.

His term as mayor ended in 2012. He is a physician trained at the UFPR - Federal University of Paraná. He is from the Brazilian Democratic Movement Party (PMDB).

References

1956 births
Brazilian people of Portuguese descent
Brazilian physicians
Brazilian Democratic Movement politicians
Living people
Federal University of Paraná alumni
Mayors of places in Brazil
People from Telêmaco Borba
People from Paraná (state)